Kang Ji-sook (born 4 February 1979) is a Korean former basketball player who competed in the 2000 Summer Olympics and in the 2004 Summer Olympics.

References

External links

1979 births
Living people
South Korean women's basketball players
Olympic basketball players of South Korea
Basketball players at the 2000 Summer Olympics
Basketball players at the 2004 Summer Olympics